Khokhlovo is a rural locality (a selo) and the administrative center of Khokhlovskoye Rural Settlement, Belgorodsky District, Belgorod Oblast, Russia. The population was 1,011 as of 2010. There are 18 streets.

Geography 
Khokhlovo is located 34 km northeast of Maysky (the district's administrative centre) by road. Petropavlovka is the nearest rural locality.

References 

Rural localities in Belgorodsky District
Belgorodsky Uyezd